The Akron Series in Poetry, published by The University of Akron Press was founded "to bring to the public writers who speak in original and compelling voices".  In addition to publishing three collections of poetry every year, The Akron Series in Poetry also sponsors the annual Akron Poetry Prize. Elton Glaser served as Editor until his retirement, and the current Series Editor is Mary Biddinger.

In 2010, The Akron Series in Poetry teamed up with the Cleveland State University Poetry Center for an offsite reading at the Association of Writers & Writing Programs conference.

Poets in the Akron Series include Emily Rosko, Jason Bredle, Joshua Harmon, Matthew Guenette, David Dodd Lee, Sarah Perrier, John Gallaher, Heather Derr-Smith, William Greenway, Alison Pelegrin, Jeff Gundy, Roger Mitchell, Ashley Capps, Beckian Fritz Goldberg, Clare Rossini, Vern Rutsala, Sharmila Voorakkara, Dennis Hinrichsen, Lynn Powell, George Bilgere, Melody Lacina, Raeburn Miller, Barry Seiler, John Minczeski, Susan Yuzna, Marlys West, Jeanne E. Clark, Brian Brodeur, and Anita Feng.

References

External links 

 University of Akron Press
 University of Akron
 Akron Poetry Prize

Poetry organizations